The McRib is a barbecue-flavored pork sandwich periodically sold by the international fast food restaurant chain McDonald's. It was first introduced to the McDonald's menu in 1981, following test marketing the year before.

After poor sales, it was removed from the menu in 1985. It was reintroduced in 1989, staying on the menu until 2005 in many countries. Since 2006, it has generally been made available for a short time each year in most markets where it is sold, typically during the fall season, although it is a permanent menu item at McDonald's restaurants in Germany and Luxembourg.

Product description
The McRib consists of a restructured boneless pork patty shaped like a miniature rack of ribs, barbecue sauce, onions, and pickles, served as a sandwich on a 5½ inch (14 cm) roll. Meat restructuring was developed by the US Army to deliver low-cost meat to troops in the field. The process was refined by a Natick Army Labs meat scientist, Dr. Roger Mandigo, leading to the McRib patty. It is primarily composed of ground pork shoulder.

Government doesn't patent their intellectual property, so anyone can use it. They (the Natick Center) presented material at technical meetings...The military allowed us to use the processes they'd developed. − Roger Mandigo, Natick Center contractor and meat scientist

In an attempt to give pork "the same stature as beef in the institutional market," the National Pork Producers Council funded Mandigo to show how to apply the new technique. Using his roadmap, McDonald's then developed "a patty of pork made from small flakes of meat taken from the shoulders of a pig"

The McRib Jr. was available briefly in 2000. This version replaced the roll with a standard hamburger bun, and was served with two pickles and a smaller pork patty.

History

1981–2004
The McRib made its debut in the United States in 1981, as a limited-time item. It was first added to menus around Kansas City. It was developed by McDonald's first Executive Chef René Arend, a native of Luxembourg who invented Chicken McNuggets in 1979. "The McNuggets were so well received that every franchise wanted them," said Arend in a 2009 interview. "There wasn’t a system to supply enough chicken. We had to come up with something to give the other franchises as a new product. So the McRib came about because of the shortage of chickens." It was his inspiration to shape the McRib patty "like a slab of ribs," despite the fact that a round patty would have been cheaper to manufacture and serve on standard hamburger buns. A packet of McRib Hot Sauce was also available when the sandwich was first being sold. The sauce was a clear liquid in a semi-chrome packet the size of a standard ketchup packet.

The McRib was not immediately successful. It test-marketed very well in the Midwest, and was added to the restaurant's permanent menu for the United States in 1981. Sales were mediocre, however, and it was removed in 1985 as McDonald's executives determined that pork is not eaten frequently enough in the United States to stay on the menu. 

After several years, it returned for a promotion. It is more popular in Germany and Luxembourg, where it remains a permanent item. The McRib was also brought back occasionally in 1989, 1990 (together with the "BBQ in a Bag" promotion), 1991, 1992 (with the Western Omelette McMuffin as part of a Western promotion), and 1993.

In summer 1994, McDonald's brought back the McRib nationally, as a tie in with the theatrical release of The Flintstones, comparing the appearance of it with the rack of ribs that topples the Flintmobile in both the animated and live action productions. McDonald's (which was featured in the film as "RocDonald's") supported the return with McRib packaging featuring the Flintstones characters and a television commercial featuring Rosie O'Donnell in her role as Betty Rubble.

After that promotion, the McRib was also sold as part of various limited time regional offerings at selected restaurants in the US and Canada from 1995 until 2004.

2005–present
On November 1, 2005, McDonald's issued a press release announcing that the McRib would be permanently removed from the menu following a "McRib Farewell Tour". McRib.com, a website registered to McDonald's, featured a petition to "Save the McRib", which was facetiously sponsored by the "Boneless Pig Farmers Association of America". On October 16, 2006, the "McRib Farewell Tour II" site appeared.

The McRib reappeared in the United States in October 2007, beginning a third "farewell tour". McDonald's sold 30 million made with over 7 million pounds (3 million kg) of pork in 2007. Its fourth reintroduction was in the end of October 2008, across the United States, Hong Kong, and Japan, with a promotional website featuring music sponsored by a "McRib DJ Plowman" in tribute to its creator. 

Additional limited time regional offerings, in various regions of the United States as well as in Canada, were made throughout 2008 and 2009.

On November 2, 2010, McDonald's began six weeks of nationwide McRib availability at the Legends of the McRib event in New York City, honoring three superfans: Joey Erwin, aka Mr. McRib; Alan Klein, founder of the McRib Locator website; and Adam Winer. The promotion ended December 5, 2010. McDonald's credited it with boosting their November 2010 sales by 4.8%. It was the first national offering of the McRib since 1994.

The McRib was offered in Canada from June 21 to August 1, 2011. On October 24, 2011, McDonald's once again made the McRib available for three weeks in a promotion ending November 14.

In celebration of the London Olympics 2012, McDonald's Australia and New Zealand reintroduced the McRib as the Atlanta Pork McRib. The McRib was one of six limited edition McDonald's items named after previous host cities. It was released on May 23 and ran until June 5. Sales of the McRib in New Zealand exceeded expectations, exhausting supplies within days of the release of the burger with restaurants running out of their allocations of stock.

For 2012, McDonald's announced that the McRib's annual release would be delayed until the December 17, as opposed to its traditional autumn release (which would instead be used to debut the Cheddar Bacon Onion Angus Burger, or "CBO"). The move was an effort to boost sales during the December period in an attempt to match 2011's abnormally high restaurant wide sales figures. 

The McRib wasn't released nationally and was sold only in a few cities in a few states in the United States (a la the 2005 "McRib Farewell Tour" promotion) in 2013 due to the company introducing several new products (such as the Mighty Wings). The McRib was sold again starting on October 20, 2014, and ending on January 4, 2015, but only in a few cities in a few states in the United States (a la the 2006 "McRib Farewell Tour II" promotion).

The McRib made a return in the United Kingdom on December 31, 2014, until February 3, 2015. The McRib was sold again starting in October 2015 and ending in January 2016, but only in a few cities in a few states in the United States (55 percent of McDonald's locations). It became available again in November 2016, but at a limited number of McDonald's locations; and once more since October 2017, but in most areas. Local McDonalds Twitter accounts announced in Southern California and Hawaii that the McRib would be returning to these locations on November 2 and 9, 2017 respectively. The McRib once again made a limited return in the United States and Australia at participating locations starting in October 2018. The McRibs rolled out once again for a limited time beginning October 7, 2019.

For 2020, McDonald's announced that the McRib would be made available nationwide in the United States for the first time since 2012, beginning on December 2. It was dubbed as "the most important sandwich of the year." It also returned for a limited run, along with the "El Maco Burger", in Australia.

On September 30, 2021, McDonald's announced on Twitter that the McRib was returning on November 1 for a limited time. The previous day on September 29, the company tweeted that there was important news coming. The McRib was available at some locations before November 1.

On October 23, 2022, McDonald's announced that the McRib would return on October 31, 2022, for what is being called "The McRib Farewell Tour", the fourth such after the 2005 and the 2007 ones. The McRib was available until November 20.

HSUS lawsuit

In November 2011, the Humane Society of the United States filed a complaint with the U.S. Securities and Exchange Commission against the producer of McRib meat, Smithfield Foods, alleging cruel and unusual treatment of the animals used in the McRib patty production. The complaint cites the use of gestation crates and poor and unsanitary living conditions, as well as a lack of proper animal welfare. 

McDonald's responded by requiring its U.S. pork suppliers to eliminate the use of gestation crates.

Limited availability
Speculation on the limited availability of the McRib includes theories concerning the fluctuating price and unreliable supply chains of bulk pork, manipulation of availability windows to turn the product into a better loss leader for the company, and the generation of renewed enthusiasm and higher sales as a result of scarcity. 

An informal study from 2011 entitled "A Conspiracy of Hogs: The McRib as Arbitrage" illustrates a correlation between the price of pork and the timing of McDonald's offering the sandwich; all five of the US McRib offerings between 2005 and 2011 occurred during low points in the price of bulk pork.

According to McDonald's, the sandwich's limited availability is due to their desire to provide a varied menu throughout the year.

In popular culture 

The sandwich, as well as the cultural phenomenon of "chasing the McRib", were the subject of a subplot in The Simpsons episode "I'm Spelling as Fast as I Can", in which it is parodied as the "Ribwich" and gains a cult following.

See also	
	
 List of sandwiches 
 List of McDonald's products

References

External links

McRib menu item at McDonald's
McRib menu item at McDonald's Germany, with in-depth product description
McRib Locator by Alan Klein

American sandwiches
McDonald's foods
Food and drink introduced in 1981
Products introduced in 1981